Onnes may refer to:

 Onnes (general), one of the generals of the mythological Assyrian king Ninus
 Onnes, alternative spelling of Onnyos, a rural locality in Amginsky District of the Sakha Republic, Russia

See also
 Onne
 Kamerlingh Onnes